Wayside Celtic F.C. is an Irish association football club based in Kilternan, Dún Laoghaire–Rathdown. Their senior men's competes in the Leinster Senior League. They also have a women's team who play in the Dublin Women's Soccer League.

History
Wayside Celtic F.C. was formed in 1948 and before joining the Leinster Senior League, they had previously played in both the Athletic Union League and the Wicklow & District Football League

Honours
Leinster Senior League: 5
1997-98, 2002–03, 2003–04, 2005–06, 2010–11
Leinster Senior Cup: 1	
1998-99
LFA Metropolitan Cup: 2	
2008, 2012
Leinster Junior Cup: 1	
1989
FAI Intermediate Cup: 3
1995-96, 2000–01, 2004–05
Wicklow & District Football League: 1
1959

References

 
Association football clubs in Dún Laoghaire–Rathdown
Leinster Senior League (association football) clubs
Former Athletic Union League (Dublin) clubs
1948 establishments in Ireland
Association football clubs established in 1948
Dublin Women's Soccer League teams